Piotr Sowisz (born September 10, 1971) is a former Polish football player.

Club statistics

References

External links

kyotosangadc

1971 births
Living people
Polish footballers
People from Wodzisław Śląski
J2 League players
Kyoto Sanga FC players
Polish expatriate footballers
Expatriate footballers in Japan
Sportspeople from Silesian Voivodeship

Association football midfielders